Cleveland State University (CSU) is a public research university in Cleveland, Ohio. It was established in 1964 and opened for classes in 1965 after acquiring the entirety of Fenn College, a private school that had been in operation since 1923. CSU absorbed the Cleveland-Marshall College of Law (since renamed the Cleveland State University College of Law) in 1969. Today it is part of the University System of Ohio, has more than 120,000 alumni, and offers over 200 academic programs. It is classified among "R2: Doctoral Universities – High research activity".

History
Public education in Cleveland was first started in 1870, when Cleveland YMCA began to offer free classes. By 1921, the program had grown enough to become separate from YMCA, being renamed Cleveland YMCA School of Technology. Two years later, the school offered courses towards a bachelor's degree for the first time. This is now regarded as Fenn College's founding date, although the college would not be formally renamed until 1929. Fenn College took over several buildings in the area including Fenn Tower, Stilwell Hall, and Foster Hall.

In 1964, the State of Ohio purchased the entirety of Fenn College's campus in downtown Cleveland and established a commuter college that targeted area residents. This new institution became known as Cleveland State University. Industrialist James J. Nance served as Chair of the first Board of Trustees. Over the next several decades, Cleveland State University quickly grew in size, and claimed over 15,000 students in 1997. However, only six hundred students resided in University housing.

In the mid 2000s, President Michael Schwartz ended open admissions and implemented a vision to move from a U.S. News & World Report fourth tier university to a second tier university.

On March 11, 2020, an email was sent to Cleveland State students regarding the changes made due to the coronavirus pandemic. Classes were all switched to remote learning.

Campus

CSU's main campus in downtown Cleveland is bounded on the east and west by Interstate 90 and East 17th Street, respectively; and by Payne Avenue to the north and Carnegie Avenue on the south. It also has a satellite campus in Westlake, Ohio which is in the Greater Cleveland metropolitan area in Cuyahoga County. As of spring 2013, the combined student body (undergraduate and graduate students) totaled over 17,000.

Campus expansion
In 2006, Cleveland State University completed its state-of-the-art student Recreation Center, and a renovation of Parker Hannifan Hall for the College of Graduate Studies.

To make the campus more amenable to residence and increase the number of students living on campus thousands of housing units were built, anchored by a new dormitory, Fenn Tower, a reuse of the school's most historic building. Fenn Tower housed what was the world's longest Foucault pendulum, but the pendulum was removed during the residence hall renovation in 2006 and is now in the Cleveland State University archives.

The university worked with private developers and the City of Cleveland to develop housing, retail, and "collegetown" amenities around Fenn Tower, particularly along the main thoroughfare of Euclid Avenue. In 2010, Euclid Avenue was upgraded as part of the Euclid Corridor Project which brought bus rapid transit to the university and connected Public Square in downtown Cleveland to University Circle, approximately four miles to the east. Cleveland State University's $65 million construction project, intended to transform the campus from a mostly commuter school into a residential campus, included the new Student Center and Julka Hull, which houses the College of Education and School of Nursing. Both projects were finished in 2010.

In 2011, the new Euclid Commons dorms complex, which features apartment-style living for CSU students, opened. That same year, the university's Dramatic Arts Program moved into the renovated Middough Building and Allen Theatre at Playhouse Square Center in collaboration with the Cleveland Play House.

In 2012, CSU opened the Galleries At CSU on Euclid Avenue. Also in 2012, Cleveland State University partnered with the South China University of Technology allowing students to complete their education and receive joint degrees. During the fall semester of 2012, the first phase of the private Langston apartment and retail complex opened along Chester Avenue across from Rhodes Tower. In the spring semester of 2013, the former Viking Hall dormitory was torn down to make way for the university's new Center for Health Professions. This was opened in the fall of 2015. The university is partnering with Northeast Ohio Medical University or NEOMED to train future health care professionals to specifically work in urban settings. They are working on adding a new physics department onto the campus and starting to build a better physics department.

In 2018, CSU established the CSU School of Film and Media Arts, having used a $7.5 million appropriation from the State of Ohio to renovate an entire floor of the IdeaStream Center at Playhouse Square. It is the first standalone film school in the State of Ohio.

Administration
The Cleveland State University Board consists of nine trustees, a Secretary to the Board, two faculty representatives, and two student representatives. The board members, along with the University President, are charged with fulfilling the goals set forth in the University Mission Statement as well as acting as the governing body in all policy matters of the university requiring attention. In January 2006 the Board of Trustees amended their bylaws so they could restructure board committees as well as include Community members on the Board. Community members serve as non-voting advisers and are appointed by the Board Chairman for a term approved by the Board.

Presidents
 
Fenn College
 Cecil V. Thomas, 1934–1947
 Joseph C. Nichols, 1947–1948
 Edward Hodnett, 1948–1951
 Alec Schatzel & Ryan Skaruppa, 1952–1965
Cleveland State University

 Harry Newburn, 1965–1966 (interim)
 Harold Enarson, 1966–1972
 Harry Newburn, 1972–1973 (interim)
 Walter Waetjen, 1973–1988
 John Flower, 1988–1992
 Claire Van Ummersen, 1993–2001
 Michael Schwartz, 2002–2009
 Ronald M. Berkman, 2009–2018
 Harlan M. Sands, 2018–2022
 Laura J. Bloomberg, 2022–present

Academics

CSU offers many disciplines and research facilities, with 70 academic majors, 27 master's degree programs, two post-master's degrees, six doctoral degrees, and two law degrees. It also has research cooperation agreements with the nearby NASA Glenn Research Center.

In 1965, when The Cleveland State University was formed, it consisted of the Fenn College of Engineering (now the Washkewicz College of Engineering), the colleges of business administration, arts and sciences, and education. In 2022, the university reorganized around eight colleges as part of its CSU 2.0 initiative:
 College of Arts and Sciences
 College of Graduate Studies
 College of Health
 College of Law
 Jack, Joseph, and Morton Mandel Honors College
 Levin College of Public Affairs and Education (includes the Maxine Goodman Levin College of Urban Affairs)
 Monte Ahuja College of Business
 Washkewicz College of Engineering

The Division of University Studies focuses on academic support services, and the Division of Continuing Education extends academic services beyond the campus.

Notable programs include the Maxine Goodman Levin College of Urban Affairs, which U.S. News & World Report 2019 ranking of graduate public affairs programs placed Levin College fourth in the Urban Policy specialty and 13th in the Local Government Management specialty, as well as the recently formed School of Communication, ranked 8th in research productivity and as the top terminal MA-granting program in the United States overall. The Monte Ahuja College of Business is also highly regarded and is ranked in the top ten nationwide in performance of its Certified Public Accountant graduate students. Additionally, CSU is the first university in Ohio to offer a master's degree in software engineering.

College of Law

The College of Law traces its origins to the founding of Cleveland Law School in 1897. One of the most famous alumni of the College of Law was Tim Russert, host of television program Meet the Press, who graduated in 1976. It was formerly known as the Cleveland–Marshall College of Law, until the school dropped Marshall's name from the school in 2022.

Research
Cleveland State maintains a variety of research links within Ohio, especially the Cleveland community. These research collaborations include:
 BioOhio
 Case Western Reserve University
 Cleveland Clinic Lerner Research Institute
 Cleveland MetroHealth Medical Center
 Council for International Exchange of Scholars (Fulbright Scholar Program)
 NASA Glenn Research Center
 Great Lakes Science Center
 Cleveland Museum of Natural History
 International Space University
 Internet2
 Ohio College of Podiatric Medicine
 Ohio Department of Education
  Ohio Instrumentation, Controls & Electronics (ICE)
 Ohio Supercomputer Center

Pseudoscience allegations
In 2022 The Chronicle of Higher Education reported on a researcher at Cleveland State University whose "home institution was essentially providing a soapbox for racist pseudoscience.[...] Despite nearly a dozen publications over more than a decade arguing for the intellectual inferiority of Black people," the professor was judged to have meritorious research and was promoted and given tenure. In 2022 he was fired following an investigation by the National Institutes of Health that found that he had violated regulations concerning the handling of medical data.

Student life

Student media
The campus' student-run radio station, 89.3 WCSB, has a 630-Watt transmitter on top of Rhodes Tower (formerly called University Tower). Additionally, Cleveland State is served in print by The Cauldron, an independent student newspaper, The Cleveland Stater, a laboratory newspaper in the School of Communication, The Vindicator, Cleveland State University's art and culture magazine, and The Gavel which won the 2005 American Bar Association's -Student Division's first prize for the best law school newspaper in the country. There is no student television station at this time, though the university offers a film production and video production major with courses through its Digital Video Communication Center and a variety of related majors through the School of Film and Media Arts.

Information technology
CSU is a member of the OneCommunity (formerly OneCleveland) computer network, an initiative of Case Western Reserve University that connects nonprofit institutions throughout Northeast Ohio, allowing large scale collaborations over a high-speed fiber optic network.

Greek organizations
Cleveland State University is home to 4 NIC fraternities, Delta Sigma Phi, Sigma Phi Epsilon, Sigma Tau Gamma, and Tau Kappa Epsilon. There are 3 NPC sororities, Delta Zeta, Phi Mu, and Theta Phi Alpha and all 9 NPHC organizations have a chapter affiliated with the campus.

Athletics

When the school was still known as Fenn College, the sports teams' nickname was the Foxes. When the university was renamed Cleveland State, the nickname changed as well, and CSU's sports teams became the "Vikings". That nickname stands to this day. The school colors are forest green and white. For many years the school mascot was the comic strip character Hägar the Horrible along with his wife Helga, and the couple appeared at sporting events as well as on University literature. A new mascot, "Vike" was introduced in 1997 and Hagar was phased out by 1998. Another new mascot named "Magnus" was introduced in August 2007.

Cleveland State fields varsity teams in 17 sports, with most teams competing in the Horizon League. The men's basketball team was noteworthy in 1986 when seeded 14th in the East Region of the NCAA tournament, it upset heavily favored 3-seed Indiana and Saint Joseph's before a one-point loss to a Navy team led by future Hall of Famer David Robinson, an unprecedented achievement for such a low seed. The Vikes made yet another NCAA tournament appearance in 2009, upsetting the highly favored 4 seed Wake Forest before falling to Arizona in the second round. The school fields two teams that compete outside the Horizon League; wrestling competes in the Mid-American Conference and men's lacrosse in the ASUN Conference.

Fielding a football team
On October 14, 2008, CSU President Michael Schwartz stated "he wants a blue ribbon panel to give him a recommendation on the football team before July 1, 2009, when he was scheduled to retire. He also said the program will have to be structured to pay for itself."

The establishment of a football team became an official item on the student government election ballot. Although over two-thirds of the voters favored establishment of a football team over half of them were not willing to pay a fee for Division I non-scholarship football in addition to any potential future tuition increases that may be instituted by the university.

Notable alumni and faculty

See also
 Krenzler Field
 Wolstein Center

References

External links

 

 
1964 establishments in Ohio
Educational institutions established in 1964
Universities and colleges in Cleveland
Downtown Cleveland
Cleveland State University (Fenn College)